Commission v Italy (2011) C-565/08 is an EU law case, concerning the freedom of establishment in the European Union.

Facts
Italian law required lawyers comply with maximum tariffs for calculation of their fees, unless there was an agreement between a lawyer and a client. Commission argued this discouraged lawyers established in other member states from going to Italy.

Judgment
The Court of Justice, Grand Chamber held that having maximum fees for lawyers was lawful. It was not a restriction just because service providers had to follow a new set of rules.

See also

European Union law

Notes

References

Court of Justice of the European Union case law